Sinotrichopeza is a genus of flies in the family Empididae.

Species
S. sinensis (Yang, Grootaert & Horvat, 2005)
S. taiwanensis (Yang & Horvat, 2006)

References

Empidoidea genera
Empididae